Newark, Michigan may refer to the following places in the U.S. state of Michigan:

 Newark, Gratiot County, Michigan, an unincorporated community in Newark Township
 Newark, Oakland County, Michigan, an unincorporated community in Holly Township